Elections for the Indian state of Goa took place 2 June 2007. Counting of votes began  5 June and the election process was completed by 8 June.

Results

Winning candidates

By-elections

Government formation 
Indian National Congress in alliance with Nationalist Congress Party and Save Goa Front formed the government.

References

External links
ECI's Page - Goa Assembly Elections, 2007

State Assembly elections in Goa
2000s in Goa
Goa